New Local, formerly known as the New Local Government Network, is an independent think tank and local government network with a mission to transform public services and unlock community power. It was founded in 1996, and is currently based in London. It is home to a network of 60+ councils and other organisations, united in a drive to create sustainable, inclusive and community-powered public services.

New Local's research blends policy and practice to tackle some of the most pressing issues the we face today. New Local believes that many of our big national challenges can only be effectively tackled locally, through public service reform, economic resilience and revitalising democracy.

Its current chief executive is Adam Lent, previously the Director of the RSA Action and Research Centre, Head of Economics and Social Affairs at the Trades Union Congress and Director of Research and Innovation at Ashoka.

The Community Paradigm 
At the heart of New Local's work is the belief in community power – the idea that people themselves should have more power and resources to shape their own futures. This imagines very different, collaborative ways of working for public services, and a much more decentralised system of governance.

Its seminal 2019 publication The Community Paradigm proposes a fundamental shift of power and resources towards the people, places and communities.

This 'paradigm shift' is needed because:

 Public services today face a threat of rising demand. They are struggling to cope with a rapidly aging population, combined with reducing resources.
 Faith in democratic legitimacy and central Government is declining.
 People expect to exercise more control over their day-to-day lives – and can do so using technology.

New Local believes that people and communities themselves have the best insight into their own situation, and public services need to work with and recognise this if they are to be fit for purpose and sustainable into the future.

There are many places in the UK and across the world where community power is beginning to flourish. Here, people are taking matters into their own hands – often working in partnership with public services and local government to build better services and places to live.

Notable publications 
Think Big, Act Small: Think Big, Act Small: Elinor Ostrom’s radical vision for community power

This Isn’t Working: reimagining employment support for people facing complex disadvantage

Communities vs. Coronavirus: The Rise of Mutual Aid

Cultivating Local Inclusive Growth: In Practice

From Tiny Acorns: Communities Shaping the Future of Children’s Services

Community Commissioning: Shaping Public Services through People Power

The Community Paradigm: Why public services need radical change and how it can be achieved

Membership 
New Local's network comprises councils across England of all tiers and with diverse political leadership; and corporate partners.

Network members are united by their appetite for innovation, a willingness to embrace change and passion to simply do things better. Frequent peer-led events give members the opportunity to meet to explore different ways of working and new approaches.

New Local's network also inspires much of its research work, which frequently draws examples and case studies from members.

Current members of the board 
 Donna Hall, Chair of Bolton NHS Trust, (Chair)
Chris Ham, Co-Chair, NHS Assembly 
Claire Kennedy, Managing Director and Co-founder, PPL 
Adam Lent, Chief Executive, New Local
Catherine Mangan, Director, Public Services Academy
Jacqui McKinlay, Director, Centre for Governance and Scrutiny 
 Robert Pollock, Director of Social Finance
 Tony Travers, Director of LSE London
Former directors include Simon Parker and Chris Leslie, former Labour MP for Shipley, between 2005 and his re-election to Parliament for Nottingham East in the general election of 2010. Dan Corry was Director between 2002 and 2005.

See also 
 List of think tanks in the United Kingdom
 Local government in England

References

External links

Political and economic think tanks based in the United Kingdom
Organizations established in 1996